Manu is a 2018 Indian Telugu language experimental romantic art film directed by debutant Phanindra Narsetti. The film stars Raja Goutham and Chandini Chowdary. The film banked on crowd funding, released to average reviews. However, the film is praised for its unique story-telling, direction, production design, music, colour correction, costumes, but criticised the film's excessive length, unnecessary detailing.

Cast 
Raja Goutham as Manu
Chandini Chowdary as Neela
Aberaam Varma as Ranga
Mohan Bhagatas Antony
John Kottoly as Akbar
Darbha Appaji Ambarisha as Rudraprathap
Bindu Chandramouli as	Neighbour
Srikanth as Amar
Bomma Sridhar		
Harikiran Gupta as Bartender

Production 
Raja Gowtham and Chandini Chowdary were cast to play the lead roles. The film was set in the 1980s and Chowdary played an English woman in the film. The film is a crowdfunded venture.

Release 
A critic from The Hindu wrote that "If only it had been less indulgent, Manu would have been worthwhile". A critic from The Times of India gave the film two-and-a-half out of five stars and wrote that "Manu had all the ingredients to be a rewarding experience, though it falls short of being one". A critic from Sify gave the film a rating of one-and-three-quarters out of five and wrote that "Manu, a thriller, is full of abstract ideas and surrealistic moments. It definitely has style and good technical values but it also is absurd and is boring". A critic from Deccan Chronicle gave the film two out of five stars and noted that "An interesting plot and good screenplay could have perhaps salvaged this film. While Manu starts off on a promising note, the director hasn’t been able to see it through till the end".

References

External links 

Indian thriller films
2018 films
2018 thriller films
2010s Telugu-language films